Naimi is a surname.

People
Abdulla Majid Al Naimi, Bahraini formerly held in extrajudicial detention in the U.S. Guantanamo Bay detention camp
Ali Al-Naimi, Saudi Arabian Minister of Petroleum and Mineral Resources
Fazlallah Astarabadi (Naimi), also known by the pen name Naimi, Iranian mystic
Majed bin Ali Al-Naimi,  Minister of Education of Bahrain
Yuval Naimi, Israeli basketball player

Other

Al-Naimi (tribe), a large Arabian tribe in the Persian Gulf region, including Iraq